Michael Alan Iuzzolino (born January 22, 1968) is an assistant men's basketball coach at Robert Morris University and a retired professional basketball player. He was selected by the Dallas Mavericks in the second round (35th pick overall) of the 1991 NBA draft. Iuzzolino, a 5-foot 10 inch point guard, played two years in the National Basketball Association (NBA), both with the Mavericks.  He averaged 9.0 points per game in his career. In 1993, he signed as a free agent with the Orlando Magic, but was waived. After his NBA career, Iuzzolino played professionally in Italy and Spain.

Iuzzolino played college basketball at Pennsylvania State University and at Saint Francis University. He played high school basketball at Altoona High School in Altoona, Pennsylvania. He was a high school teammate of Doug West, who went on to have a successful NBA career with the Minnesota Timberwolves and Vancouver Grizzlies.

Iuzzolino held assistant coaching positions at Saint Vincent College, Duquesne University, and George Mason University before becoming the director of basketball operations at Canisius College. In 2013, he assumed the same role at the University New Mexico.

Iuzzolino was featured in the 1993 arcade edition of the popular video game NBA Jam.  He is an Italian American, and holds an Italian passport.
Iuzzolino was inducted into the Blair County Sports Hall of Fame alongside Coach John Swogger.
In April 2017, Iuzzolino's number 8 jersey was retired by Scaligera Verona in a ceremony prior to Verona-Treviso game in Italian second division.

References

External links
 College & NBA stats @ basketballreference.com

1968 births
Living people
American emigrants to Italy
American expatriate basketball people in Greece
American expatriate basketball people in Spain
American men's basketball coaches
American men's basketball players
American women's basketball coaches
Basketball coaches from Pennsylvania
Basketball players from Pennsylvania
Canisius Golden Griffins men's basketball coaches
Cantabria Baloncesto players
CB Valladolid players
Citizens of Italy through descent
Dallas Mavericks draft picks
Dallas Mavericks players
Duquesne Dukes women's basketball coaches
Fort Wayne Fury players
Italian basketball coaches
Italian men's basketball players
Italian expatriate basketball people in Spain
Italian expatriate basketball people in Greece
Liga ACB players
Olimpia Milano players
Pallacanestro Pavia players
Pallacanestro Virtus Roma players
Penn State Nittany Lions basketball players
Peristeri B.C. players
Point guards
Rapid City Thrillers players
Robert Morris Colonials men's basketball coaches
Rochester Renegade players
Saint Francis Red Flash men's basketball players
Saint Vincent College
Scaligera Basket Verona players
Shreveport Crawdads players
Sportspeople from Altoona, Pennsylvania